Ernie McLean may refer to:
 Ernest McLean, American rhythm and blues and jazz guitarist
 Ernie McLean (politician), member of the Newfoundland and Labrador House of Assembly for Lake